The following have served as presidents of the British Numismatic Society since its inception in 1903.

See also
List of presidents of the Royal Numismatic Society

References

British Numismatic Society Presidents